Bennie Amey III (born March 24, 1985), known professionally as Blanco Brown, is an American country music artist, singer, songwriter, record producer, and rapper who has produced for Chris Brown and Pitbull. Brown's debut single "The Git Up" was released in April 2019 and as of October 2022 has over 300 million streams on Spotify. In June 2019, Brown debuted on the Billboard charts, appearing at No. 41 on Emerging Artists. "The Git Up" later topped the Hot Country Songs chart and reached the top 20 of the Billboard Hot 100.

Early life
Amey was raised in Atlanta, Georgia listening to hip hop artists, such as Outkast. In the summer days, Amey would visit his grandmother in Butler, Georgia where he would listen to country music, such as Johnny Cash. Amey would go on to appreciate both forms of music.

Career

"The Git Up" challenge
Brown posted a YouTube video with country artist Lainey Wilson to teach people how to do the dance. "The Git Up" Challenge increased in popularity after the video was released and was featured in over 130,000 videos on TikTok. The song reached No. 1 on Billboards Hot Country Songs chart.

In 2021, Brown achieved a second number-one single on the country music charts as a featured vocalist on the band Parmalee's single "Just the Way".

Personal life
On August 31, 2020, Brown was in a motorcycle accident that broke his wrists, arms, legs, and pelvis. He underwent a 12-hour surgery and successfully recovered one month later.

Discography

Studio albums

Extended plays

Singles

Written and co-written songs

Produced and co-produced songs

References

Living people
American country singer-songwriters
1985 births
African-American country musicians
Record producers from Georgia (U.S. state)
Country rap musicians
African-American songwriters
21st-century African-American people
20th-century African-American people
American male singer-songwriters